Begum Serajunnessa Choudhury was a Member of the 3rd National Assembly of Pakistan as a representative of East Pakistan.

Early life and family
Choudhury was born in 1910, to the Dewan family of Rajnagar in Sylhet District, Eastern Bengal and Assam, British India. Her father, Dewan Abdul Halim Chowdhury, was an influential Bengali Muslim zamindar. She was privately educated at her home, where she studied Bengali, English and Islamic studies.

She married Abdur Rasheed Choudhury of Dargapasha, a member of the Assam Legislative Assembly and later a member of the Central Legislative Assembly in Delhi. They lived in Rashid Manzil, Sylhet and had seven children; five sons, including Humayun Rashid Choudhury and Faruk Rashid Chowdhury, and two daughters.

Career
After the death of her husband in 1944, Serajunnessa Choudhury undertook the management of his zamindari property and tea gardens. She became the managing director of Rashid Enterprises Limited and Hamdard Tea Company Limited, the vice-chairman of Pakistan National Tea Association, mutawalli (guardian) of the Serajnagar and Rashidabad Waqf Tea Garden. She also served as a member of the managing committee of the Durgapasha Abdur Rashid Kindergarten.

Choudhury was a Member of the 3rd National Assembly of Pakistan. In Parliament, she questioned why all the service branch headquarters were located in West Pakistan.

Death
She died in 1974, in Bangladesh. Begum Sirajunnesa Chowdhury Hall of Shahjalal University of Science and Technology was named after her.

References

Pakistani MNAs 1962–1965
People from Rajnagar Upazila
1910 births
1974 deaths
20th-century Bengalis
20th-century Pakistani women politicians
20th-century Bangladeshi women politicians